Kvirike I (died 918) was a Prince and Chorepiscopus of Kakheti in eastern Georgia from 893 to 918.

He succeeded upon the death of Padla I of Kakheti, his possible father. In 914, he faced an Arab invasion led by Yusuf Ibn Abi'l-Saj who took hold of the fortresses of Ujarma and Bochorma, but the former was given back to Kvirike following his plead for peace. Next year, Kvirike forged an alliance with Constantine III of Abkhazia against his eastern neighbor Hereti, a principality in the Georgian-Albanian marchlands. The allies invaded Hereti and divided its major strongholds, with the Orchobi fortress being allotted to Kakheti. He was succeeded by his son, Padla II upon his death in 918.

Bibliography 
Toumanoff, Cyrille (1976, Rome). Manuel de Généalogie et de Chronologie pour le Caucase chrétien (Arménie, Géorgie, Albanie).
Вахушти Багратиони. История царства грузинского. Возникновение и жизнь Кахети и Эрети. Ч.1.

918 deaths
Princes of Kakheti
Year of birth unknown